The New Don Ellis Band Goes Underground is an album by trumpeter/bandleader Don Ellis recorded in 1969 and released on the Columbia label.

Reception

Scott Yanow of Allmusic says the album is "one of trumpeter Don Ellis' lesser efforts". On All About Jazz, Jim Santella said "this big band album from Don Ellis proved inspirational. It gave a contemporary quality to big band music - the kind of force that influenced college and university stage bands around the world. Vocals were added, and Ellis emphasized a smooth, pop quality to his arrangements. Melodies were easy to follow, and the songs caught all the emotion that he pumped in so generously. Nevertheless, the album contains the same kind of musical virtuosity that Ellis had demonstrated on earlier albums".

Track listing 
All compositions by Don Ellis except as indicated
 "House in the Country" (Al Kooper) - 2:48
 "Don't Leave Me" (Harry Nilsson) - 3:40
 "Higher" (Sly Stone) - 3:19
 "Bulgarian Bulge" (Traditional) - 3:03
 "Eli's Comin'" (Laura Nyro) - 4:08
 "Acoustical Lass" - 2:32
 "Good Feelin'" - 6:14
 "Send My Baby Back" (Lonnie Hewitt, Ernest Marbray) - 3:02
 "Love for Rent" (Fred Selden) - 4:06
 "It's Your Thing" (Ronald Isley, O'Kelly Isley, Jr., Rudolph Isley) - 2:54
 "Ferris Wheel" - 3:46
 "Black Baby" (Don Ellis, Patti Allen) - 3:29

Personnel 
Don Ellis - trumpet, flugelhorn, arranger
Patti Allen – vocals
John Klemmer, Hadley Caliman – tenor saxophone, flute
Mike Altschul – clarinet, flute, baritone saxophone
Fred Seldon – clarinet, flute, alto saxophone, soprano saxophone
Lonnie Shetter – clarinet, flute, oboe, alto saxophone, soprano saxophone
Sam Falzone – clarinet, flute, tenor saxophone
Doug Bixby – tuba
Stuart Blumberg, John Rosenberg, Glenn Stuart, Jack Coan – trumpet, flugelhorn
Jock Ellis, Glenn Ferris – trombone
Dana Hughes – bass trombone
Jay Graydon – guitar
Peter Robinson – piano, electric piano
Jo Julian, Carol Kaye – bass
Ralph Humphrey, Rick Quintinal – percussion, drums, vibraphone
Lee Pastora – percussion, bongos, congas

References 

Don Ellis albums
1969 albums
Albums produced by Al Kooper
Columbia Records albums